Leo Kottke: 1971–1976 is a compilation album of songs released on Capitol during Kottke's tenure with that label. It is sometimes referred to as Did You Hear Me? due to the handwritten caption on the photo on the cover. It peaked at #153 on the Billboard Pop Albums charts.

History
After the release of Chewing Pine, Kottke subsequently signed with Chrysalis Records. Six of the songs here were edited or re-mixed for this release. The track "Morning is the Long Way Home" is an edited down version of the original release from Ice Water, minus the vocals. Kottke would re-record this version again in 1999 on One Guitar, No Vocals.

The song "Pamela Brown" was also featured as the sole Leo Kottke track in a promotional-only compilation album from 1976 issued by Capitol records entitled The Greatest Music Ever Sold (Capitol SPRO-8511/8512), which was distributed to record stores during the 1976 Holiday season as part of Capitol's "Greatest Music Ever Sold" campaign. The campaign promoted 15 different Best Of... albums released by the label. Each of the actual albums represented were adorned with a gold-foiled round sticker which read "The Greatest Music Ever Sold", adhered to the front of the shrinkwrap.

Track listing
All tracks composed by Leo Kottke; except where indicated

Side one
 "Morning is the Long Way Home" Instrumental Break – 3:40 
 "June Bug" – 2:12
 "When Shrimps Learn to Whistle" – 3:30
 "Room 8" – 2:58
 "Cripple Creek" (Traditional, arranged by Leo Kottke) – 1:55
 "Pamela Brown" (Tom T. Hall) – 4:03
 "Standing on the Outside" (Leo Kottke, Mary Kottke) – 2:31

Side two
 "Grim to the Brim" – 3:10
 "Power Failure" (Gary Brooker, Keith Reid) – 2:22
 "You Tell Me Why" (Ron Elliott) – 3:56
 "Why Ask Why?" (Norman Gimbel, Ken Lauber) – 2:09
 "Open Country Joy (Constant Traveler)" (John McLaughlin) – 3:39
 "All Through the Night" (Traditional, arranged by Leo Kottke) – 1:38
 "The Scarlatti Rip-Off" – 3:26

Personnel
Leo Kottke - 6 & 12-string guitar
Bill Peterson - bass
Bill Berg - drums
Bill Barber - piano, synthesizer
Larry Taylor - bass
Paul Lagos - drums
Herb Pilhofer - piano
Production notes:
Produced by Denny Bruce
Art Direction: John Van Hamersveld
Photography: John Seidermann, Denny Bruce

References

External links
 Leo Kottke's official site
 Unofficial Leo Kottke web site (fan site)

Albums produced by Denny Bruce
Leo Kottke compilation albums
1976 compilation albums
Capitol Records compilation albums